Andrzej Kobylański born 31 July 1970 in Ostrowiec Świętokrzyski) is a Polish former professional footballer who played as a striker or midfielder. As of March 2012, Kobylański works as assistant manager for KS Cracovia.

Kobylański's father, Alfred Kobylański and his son, Martin Kobylański, have both been professional footballers.

Career 
He represented his native country at the 1992 Summer Olympics in Barcelona. The Polish team won the silver medal.

References

External links 
 
 

1970 births
Living people
People from Ostrowiec Świętokrzyski
Sportspeople from Świętokrzyskie Voivodeship
Association football midfielders
Association football forwards
Polish footballers
Poland international footballers
Bundesliga players
2. Bundesliga players
KSZO Ostrowiec Świętokrzyski players
Siarka Tarnobrzeg players
1. FC Köln players
Tennis Borussia Berlin players
Hannover 96 players
SV Waldhof Mannheim players
Widzew Łódź players
FC Energie Cottbus players
Wisła Płock players
Wuppertaler SV players
Polish expatriate footballers
Expatriate footballers in Germany
Olympic footballers of Poland
Footballers at the 1992 Summer Olympics
Olympic silver medalists for Poland
Olympic medalists in football
Medalists at the 1992 Summer Olympics